The 2008 FedEx Cup Playoffs, the series of four golf tournaments that determined the season champion on the U.S.-based PGA Tour, were held from August 21 to September 28. They consisted of four events:
The Barclays
Deutsche Bank Championship
BMW Championship
The Tour Championship

These were the second FedEx Cup playoffs since their inception in 2007. After the first three events, Vijay Singh was assured of winning the 2008 FedEx Cup as long as he completed all four rounds of The Tour Championship without disqualification, which he proceeded to do.  Tiger Woods, having topped the regular season points list after playing in only six events, did not play in the FedEx Cup Playoffs due to knee surgery.

The point distributions can be seen here.

Regular season rankings
 

For the full list see here

The Barclays
The Barclays was played August 21–24. 144 players were eligible to play but nine did not enter: Tiger Woods (1) – knee, Luke Donald (44) – wrist, Lee Westwood (50) – personal decision, Justin Rose (78) – played KLM Open, Alex Čejka (91) – arm, Jason Bohn (96) – back, Bob Tway (119) – caddied for son Kevin in U.S. Amateur, Bob Estes (124) – getting married, Roland Thatcher (140) – wrist. 

Of the 135 players who entered the tournament, 72 of them made the cut at 1-over par. Vijay Singh won in a playoff over Sergio García and Kevin Sutherland. The top 120 players in the points standings advanced to the Deutsche Bank Championship.

Full leaderboard

Deutsche Bank Championship
The Deutsche Bank Championship was played from August 29 to September 1. 120 players were eligible to play but five did not enter: Tiger Woods (15) – knee, Luke Donald (71) – wrist, Lee Westwood (76) and Justin Rose (103) – played the Johnnie Walker Championship at Gleneagles, Alex Čejka (120) – arm. 

Of the 115 players who entered the tournament, 86 of them made the 36-hole cut at −3. There was a second, 54-hole cut, that reduced the field to 72 players, again at −3. Vijay Singh, who won the first playoff event, won by shooting a tournament record −22 (262). The top 70 players in the points standings advanced to the BMW Championship.

Full leaderboard

BMW Championship
The BMW Championship was played September 4–7. 70 players were eligible to play but one, Tiger Woods (32) – knee, did not enter. There was no cut for this tournament. 

Camilo Villegas won by shooting −15. This was Villegas' first win on the PGA Tour. Chad Campbell withdrew after the first round to attend the birth of his first child. He earned no FedEx Cup points but at the end of the BMW Championship he was in 30th place in the standings. The top 30 players in the points standings advanced to The Tour Championship.

Full leaderboard

The Tour Championship
The Tour Championship was played September 25–28 after a two-week break for the Ryder Cup. All 30 players eligible to play did so. There was no cut for this tournament. Camilo Villegas won the tournament on the first playoff hole with Sergio García. Vijay Singh won the FedEx Cup.

Full leaderboard

Final leaderboard

See here for the full lists of (1) Final Playoff Standings and (2) Bonus Pool Prizes

Table of qualifying players
Table key:

* First-time Playoffs qualifier
† MDF – made cut, did not finish (i.e. cut after third round)

References

FedEx Cup
FedEx Cup Playoffs